John Laporte (November 4, 1798 – August 22, 1862) was a Jacksonian member of the U.S. House of Representatives from Pennsylvania. He also was the 26th Speaker of the Pennsylvania House of Representatives.

Biography
John Laporte was born in Asylum, Pennsylvania. He was Auditor of Bradford County, Pennsylvania, in 1827 and 1828. He was a member of the Pennsylvania House of Representatives from 1828 to 1832 and served as speaker in 1831 and 1832.  
Laporte was elected as a Jacksonian to the Twenty-third and Twenty-fourth Congresses. He was not a candidate for renomination in 1836. He served as associate judge of Bradford County from 1837 to 1845. He was interested in the development of the North Branch Canal and served as surveyor general of Pennsylvania from 1845 to 1851.  He was engaged in banking at Towanda, Pennsylvania, from 1850 to 1862.

He died in Philadelphia in 1862, aged 63; he was interred in the family cemetery at Asylum, Pennsylvania, near Towanda. 
Laporte, Pennsylvania is named after him.

Sources

The Political Graveyard

1798 births
1862 deaths
Members of the Pennsylvania House of Representatives
Pennsylvania state court judges
American bankers
Politicians from Philadelphia
People from Towanda, Pennsylvania
Speakers of the Pennsylvania House of Representatives
Jacksonian members of the United States House of Representatives from Pennsylvania
19th-century American politicians